This is the list of episodes for the Food Network competition reality series Chopped, beginning with season 41. New episodes are broadcast on Tuesdays at 8 p.m. ET.

Series overview

Episodes

Season 41 (2018–20)

Season 42 (2018–20)

Season 43 (2019–20)

Season 44 (2019–20)

Season 45 (2020)

Season 46 (2020)

Season 47 (2020–21)

Season 48 (2020–21)

Season 49 (2020–21)

Season 50 (2021–22)

Season 51 (2021–2022)

Season 52 (2022)

Season 53 (2022–)

Season 54 (2022–)

Season 55 (2023–)

Specials

Food Networks Stars! (2012)

Grill Masters Tournament (2012)

Grill Masters Tournament (2015)

Chopped: Impossible (2015)

Secrets of Winning (2015)

Grill Masters Napa (2016)

Grill Masters Tournament (2017)

Just Desserts (2018)

Grill Masters Tournament (2018)

Just Desserts (2020)

A Very Chopped Holiday (2020)

See also

List of Chopped: Canada episodes
List of Chopped Junior episodes
List of Chopped Sweets episodes

References

External links
 Chopped episode guide at FoodNetwork.com
 Chopped Junior episode guide at FoodNetwork.com

Lists of food television series episodes